A toy soldier is a miniature figurine that represents a soldier.

Toy soldier(s) may also refer to:

Books
 The Toy Soldier, collection of poetry by F. D. Reeve
 Toy Soldiers (novel), a novel by Paul Leonard based on the Dr. Who science fiction television series

Film and television

Film
 Toy Soldiers (1984 film), an action film in which students vacationing in Central America are held hostage by terrorists
 Toy Soldiers (1991 film), an action/drama film in which terrorists take a school hostage
 Toy Soldiers (2010 film), a British documentary film
 The Toy Soldiers, a 2014 American drama film

TV
 "Toy Soldiers", an episode of the science fiction television show Space: Above and Beyond
 "Toy Soldiers", an episode of Painkiller Jane
 "The Toy Soldier", an episode of Bonanza

Games
 Toy Soldiers (video game), an action-strategy video game by Signal Studios released on Xbox Live Arcade in 2010
 Toy Soldiers: Cold War, a 2012 multiplayer action-strategy video game sequel to Toy Soldiers
 Toy Soldiers: War Chest, the third video game of the series.

Music
 Toy Soldiers (band), an indie rock band from Philadelphia, Pennsylvania
 "Toy Soldier", an Irish electropop trio formed in Cork City in 2010
 "Toy Soldier", a term given to members of the Army of Toy Soldiers (formerly the fan club of musician Dr. Steel)

Songs
 "Toy Soldier", a single by Frankie Valli & the Four Seasons, Crewe and Gaudio The Four Seasons discography, 1965
 "Toy Soldier", a Britney Spears song featured on her 2007 studio album, Blackout
 "Toy Soldiers" (song), a 1988 song by Martika
 "Like Toy Soldiers", a 2004 Eminem song that sampled Martika's song
 "My Toy Soldier", a 50 Cent song from his 2005 studio album, The Massacre

See also
Small Soldiers, a 1998 movie about action figures
Small Soldiers (soundtrack)
Small Soldiers (video game)